Sovetskiy Soyuz (literally: Soviet Union) is the fourth Russian Arktika-class nuclear-powered icebreaker operated by FSUE Atomflot. The ship, which is named after the Soviet Union, was built by Baltic Shipyard in Leningrad and entered service in 1990. She was decommissioned in 2014.

In January 2016, it was reported that the icebreaker will be converted into a command ship. However, this was later retracted and the nuclear-powered icebreaker is now slated for scrapping.

References

External links

Icebreakers of the Soviet Union
Nuclear-powered icebreakers
Icebreakers of Russia
1986 ships
Ships built at the Baltic Shipyard